The Tobacco Settlement Financing Corporation is a New York State public-benefit corporation that is administered by New York State Homes and Community Renewal. It used to be a subsidiary to the State of New York Municipal Bond Bank Agency. The Tobacco Settlement Financing Corporation was created as a separate legal subsidiary of the New York State Municipal Bond Bank Agency to securitize a portion of the State's future revenues from its share of the 1998 Master Settlement with the participating cigarette manufacturers in order to make a $4.2 billion payment to State's General Fund. During calendar year 2003, the Tobacco Settlement Financing Corporation issued bonds and remitted the $4.2 billion payment to the State. In 2017, it had operating expenses of $2.94 million, no outstanding debt, and a staffing level of 267 people.

See also

 Empire State Development Corporation
 New York Local Government Assistance Corporation
 New York State Housing Finance Agency

References

External links
 NYSHCR web page describing TSFC role

Public benefit corporations in New York (state)
Politics of New York (state)
Public benefit corporations